The Tripunithura Kathakali Kendram Ladies Troupe was formed in 1975 breaking the 300 year tradition that only men performed Kathakali dance. The troupe was recognised with an award of the Nari Shakti Puraskar on International Women's Day in 2017.

Background
Kathakali dance is a classic Indian dance form that was traditionally performed by men. Dancers use masks to play different roles. For three hundred years it was performed only by male members of a particular high caste and it was not until the caste system was legally abolished in 1946 that others were able to train. After 1946, boys could enroll in academies, but the only route for girls was to seek out private tuition.

The Tripunithura Kathakali Kendram Ladies Troupe was formed in 1975 at Tripunithura in Kerala. It was not the first women's troupe as that had been formed in 1962 in Thrissur, Nadananiketan, but had lasted only until 1968. The women involved in the troupe had considered learning other dance forms but they believed that Kathakali was the most developed. They could have appeared with male dancers as Chavara Parukutty Amma has done, but they feared the gossip and the advances of drunken men, so they preferred to form an all-woman troupe. They were trained by leading exponents including Kalamandalam Krishnan Nair who was one of the most renowned Kathakali artists, and attracted attention from academics. One group studied them for eight months.

Their "exceptional" example of "women empowerment" was recognised by the Indian government with the Nari Shakti Puraskar. On International Women's Day in 2017, a representative received the award from President Pranab Mukherjee in New Delhi.

References

1975 establishments in Kerala
Kathakali exponents
Dance groups
Organisations based in Kerala